The African goose is a breed of domestic goose derived from the wild swan goose (Anser cygnoides). Despite the name African goose, they are not actually from Africa and are descended from the Chinese goose.

Origin 
Its origin has been attributed to many different continents - it arrived in Europe in the late 1700s and North America from ships that traveled around the world in the mid 1800s. Two origin theories persist for the fowl: the first purporting that African is the result of crosses of swan goose and Chinese goose, while the other asserts that it is a direct derivation of the swan goose, and its unique traits are simply the result of selective breeding. Whichever is the case, the African goose has existed as a distinct breed since the middle of the nineteenth century or before, and was admitted to the American Poultry Association's Standard of Perfection in 1874. The African goose has many physical similarities, such as shape and coloration, to the Lion Head Geese in China, showing evidence of selective breeding. The two can be distinguished by the African's larger dewlap and different knob shape. African geese are also a bit heavier than Chinese. A potential theory for where the name African Goose was derived from is that at the time of discovery, the term “Guinea” was used to describe anything foreign or unknown. Since Guinea is off the coast of Africa, the African Goose may have been named in a similar way.

Description 
The African Goose is a large, heavy bird - though not as heavy as the Toulouse or White Embden. It has a wide, heavy body and a long, thick neck, and a large knob attached to its forehead. Adult males are taller than females and average around 22 pounds, while adult females are shorter and stockier, averaging about 18 pounds. A crescent-shaped dewlap hangs from the African Goose’s lower jaw and upper neck and can become ragged as it ages. The dewlap develops slowly, taking 12–36 months to fully develop. There are 3 color varieties of the African Goose: grey, brown, or white. The white variety has all white plumage, and orange colored bills and knobs. The brown geese have a variety of colors in their feathers, ranging from very light to very dark brown, and black bills and knobs. All three varieties can be found in North America. With a lifespan of 10–15 years, the African Goose is considered one of the longest living geese.

Call 
The male and female African Goose have distinct calls that allow birders to identify them without seeing them. The adult male African Goose makes a long, high-pitched, two-syllable honking call that is often compared to the sound of a tugboat. The adult female’s call is a deeper, shorter, one-syllable honk.

Environment 
African Geese are often bred for meat and feathers, so they are commonly domesticated and raised on farms. In northern climates, the knobs of African Geese tend to become frostbitten if they do not find protection from the cold in winter months. If the knob is frostbit, it may turn orange. When tissue is healed, typically a year later, the knob returns to black.

Behavior 
African Geese are known for their docile temperaments. However, when facing a potential threat, male African Geese become more aggressive and will hiss at the enemy. When in the presence of a male, the female tends to just back away from a predator while honking. The female African Goose is very protective of her young, and will hiss if there is no male around, and if she feels threatened by her surroundings. Females typically lay 20-40 eggs per year. Their eggs are extra large, weighing 5-8 ounces, and white, and take about 30–32 days to hatch. They form bonds with their mates, and can reproduce for many years.

Diet 

African Geese typically feed on larvae and pupae found under rocks, small aquatic animals, plant material, seeds, small fish, snails, and crabs. African Geese who live in ponds open to the public are often fed snacks such as bread, but too much of this is unhealthy for them and often causes health problems down the road. When humans feed geese, the geese often become dependent on humans for food, leading to potential starvation or death when the feeding stops.

References
Sources
American Livestock Breed Conservation Articles: Chinese Geese; African Geese
Metzer Farms African Geese Information
Roy's Farm African Goose Characteristics, Origins, and Usage Info
Beauty of Birds African Goose
Citations

Geese
Poultry
Goose breeds